Nawaf Ahmed (born 17 February 1992) is a cricketer who plays for the Kuwait national cricket team. In July 2019, he was named in Kuwait's Twenty20 International (T20I) squad for the Regional Finals of the 2018–19 ICC T20 World Cup Asia Qualifier tournament. He made his T20I debut for Kuwait against Malaysia on 22 July 2019. In October 2021, he was named in Kuwait's squad for the Group A matches in the 2021 ICC Men's T20 World Cup Asia Qualifier.

References

External links
 

1992 births
Living people
Kuwaiti cricketers
Kuwait Twenty20 International cricketers
Pakistani expatriates in Kuwait
Place of birth missing (living people)